The 1981 season was the Chicago Bears' 62nd in the National Football League, and their fourth under head coach Neill Armstrong. The team failed to improve on their 7–9 record from 1980 to finish at 6–10, and failed to make the playoffs for the second consecutive season. At the end of the season, Neill Armstrong was fired by the Bears.

One unusual sidelight to the season was that of the Bears' 6 victories, 4 of them were against opponents in the AFC West; including a 20–17 upset of San Diego in Week 9 and a 35–24 victory that eliminated the Broncos from playoff contention on the final week of the regular season.

1981 NFL Draft

Free Agent Signings 

After the draft, the Bears signed multiple undrafted free agents, 3 of whom made the team when preseason ended: Tulane wide receiver Marcus Anderson, Alcorn State cornerback Leslie Frazier and Iowa center Jay Hilgenberg.

Roster

Schedule

Game summaries

Week 1

Week 2

Week 3

Week 8

Week 15

Week 16

Standings

References

External links 

 1981 Chicago Bears Season at www.bearshistory.com

Chicago Bears
Chicago Bears seasons
Chicago